Neoeburnella is a monotypic genus of West African dwarf spiders containing the single species, Neoeburnella avocalis. It was first described by A. Ö. Koçak in 1986, and has only been found in Côte d'Ivoire.

See also
 List of Linyphiidae species (I–P)

References

Linyphiidae
Monotypic Araneomorphae genera
Spiders of Africa